The Muppets are an American ensemble cast of puppet characters known for an absurdist, burlesque, and self-referential style of variety-sketch comedy. Created by Jim Henson in 1955, they are the focus of a media franchise that encompasses television, film, music, and other media associated with the characters. Originally owned by the Jim Henson Company for nearly five decades, the franchise was purchased by the Walt Disney Company in 2004.

The Muppets originated in the short-form television series Sam and Friends, which aired from 1955 to 1961. Following appearances on late-night talk shows and in advertising during the 1960s, the Muppets began appearing on Sesame Street (1969–present) and attained celebrity status and international recognition through The Muppet Show (1976–1981), which received four Primetime Emmy Award wins and 21 nominations during its five-year run.

During the 1970s and 1980s, the Muppets diversified into theatrical films, including The Muppet Movie (1979); The Great Muppet Caper (1981); and The Muppets Take Manhattan (1984). Disney began involvement with them in the late 1980s, during which Henson entered negotiations to sell The Jim Henson Company. 

The Muppets continued their media presence on television with Muppet Babies (1984–91); The Jim Henson Hour (1989) and Muppets Tonight (1996–98), both of which were similar in format to The Muppet Show; three theatrical films: The Muppet Christmas Carol (1992), Muppet Treasure Island (1996) and Muppets from Space (1999); and the television film It's a Very Merry Muppet Christmas Movie (2002).

Disney acquired the Muppets from the Henson family in February 2004. Under Disney, subsequent projects included the television film The Muppets' Wizard of Oz (2005), the television special A Muppets Christmas: Letters to Santa (2008), two theatrical films: The Muppets (2011) and Muppets Most Wanted (2014), a primetime series (2015–2016), a reboot of Muppet Babies (2018–2022), the streaming television series Muppets Now (2020), and the Halloween special Muppets Haunted Mansion (2021).

Throughout their six-decade existence, the Muppets have been regarded as a staple of the entertainment industry and popular culture in the United States and English-speaking areas. They have been recognized by various cultural institutions and organizations, including the American Film Institute, Academy of Motion Picture Arts and Sciences, Library of Congress, and the Hollywood Walk of Fame.

History

1950s–1960s: Beginnings

The Muppets were created by puppeteer Jim Henson in the 1950s; Henson claimed, but later recanted, that he coined the term Muppet as a blend of the words marionette and puppet. Among Henson's earliest creations was Kermit the Frog, who became his most recognizable character. Originally conceived for an adult audience, the Muppets were introduced in 1955 in Sam and Friends, a short-form television series produced for WRC-TV in Washington, D.C. Developed by Henson and his future wife, Jane Nebel, the series was the first form of puppet media not to incorporate a physical proscenium arch typical of such works, relying instead on the natural framing of the television set through which it was viewed.

During the 1960s, the characters—in particular, Kermit and Rowlf the Dog—appeared in skits on several late-night talk shows and on television commercials, including The Ed Sullivan Show. Rowlf became the first Muppet character to appear regularly on network television when he began appearing with Jimmy Dean on The Jimmy Dean Show. In 1966, Joan Ganz Cooney and Lloyd Morrisett began developing a children's educational television program and approached Henson to design a cast of Muppet characters during this stage. Produced by the Children's Television Workshop, the program debuted as Sesame Street in 1969.

Henson and his creative team became closely involved with Sesame Street during the years that followed; Henson waived his performance fee in exchange for retaining ownership rights to the Muppet characters created for the program. Sesame Street garnered a positive response, and the Muppets' involvement in the series was said to be a vital component of its increasing popularity, providing an "effective and pleasurable viewing" method of presentation for its educational curriculum.

1970s: The Muppet Show and foray into film
In the early 1970s, the Muppets continued their presence in television, primarily appearing in The Land of Gorch segments during the first season of Saturday Night Live. As his involvement with Sesame Street continued, Henson began developing a network television series focusing on the Muppets; as opposed to Sesame Street, however, this series would be aimed at a more adult audience and focus largely on sketch comedy. Two television pilots, The Muppets Valentine Show and The Muppet Show: Sex and Violence, aired on ABC in 1974 and 1975, respectively.

After ABC passed on the pilots and other networks in the United States expressed little interest in the project, British producer Lew Grade approached Henson and agreed to co-produce the series for Associated Television. Debuting in 1976, The Muppet Show introduced new characters such as Miss Piggy, Fozzie Bear, and Gonzo, alongside existing characters such as Kermit and Rowlf. Aired in first-run syndication in the United States, The Muppet Show became increasingly popular due to its sketch-variety format, unique form of vaudeville-style humor, and prolific roster of guest stars. It was nominated for twenty-one Primetime Emmy Awards during its run, winning four, including Outstanding Variety Series in 1978. The success of The Muppet Show allowed Henson Associates to diversify into theatrical films, the first of which, The Muppet Movie, was released in 1979.

1980s–1990s: Subsequent projects 
Following The Muppet Movie were The Great Muppet Caper and The Muppets Take Manhattan, released in 1981 and 1984, respectively. Collectively, the three films received four Academy Award nominations. The Muppet Show ended its five-season run in 1981. In 1983, Henson debuted Fraggle Rock, which aired on HBO in the United States until 1987.

In 1989, Henson entered negotiations with Michael Eisner and The Walt Disney Company, in which the latter would acquire Jim Henson Productions and, in turn, the Muppets. Disney expressed interest in purchasing the company for $150 million. Eisner was also interested in acquiring the Sesame Street Muppet characters, but Henson declined that proposal, considering it a "non-starter" for the deal. An "agreement in principle" for the acquisition was publicly announced by Disney and Henson at the Disney-MGM Studios theme park in Walt Disney World on August 28, 1989, along with plans for Muppets-themed attractions to debut at that park and at Disneyland the following year.

However, the proposed merger was cancelled after Henson's death in 1990. Nevertheless, Disney initiated a licensing agreement with Jim Henson Productions to continue developing Muppets attractions. The following year, Muppet*Vision 3D debuted at Disney–MGM Studios, the only attraction successfully developed from the original plans. Disney also co-produced the fourth and fifth Muppets films, The Muppet Christmas Carol (1992), which featured Michael Caine as Ebenezer Scrooge, and Muppet Treasure Island (1996), with Jim Henson Productions. The characters subsequently starred in Muppets Tonight, which aired from 1996 to 1998; and a sixth film, Muppets from Space, released by Columbia Pictures in 1999.

In 2000, Henson was sold to EM.TV & Merchandising AG for $680 million. However, EM.TV's stock collapsed and the Henson family re-acquired the company in 2003, with the exception of the Sesame Street characters, which were in the interim sold to Sesame Workshop.

2000s: Disney acquisition
Fourteen years after initial negotiations began, Disney acquired the Muppets intellectual property from Henson for $75 million on February 17, 2004. The acquisition consisted of a majority of the Muppets film and television library, as well as the Bear in the Big Blue House television series. Exceptions included the Sesame Street characters; the Fraggle Rock characters, which were retained by Henson; the distribution rights to four films: The Muppets Take Manhattan, Muppets from Space, and Kermit's Swamp Years, which were retained by Sony Pictures Entertainment; and It's a Very Merry Muppet Christmas Movie, retained by NBCUniversal Television Distribution. Following the acquisition, Disney formed The Muppets Studio (originally The Muppets Holding Company), a wholly owned subsidiary responsible for managing the characters and franchise. As a result, the term "Muppet" became a legal trademark of Disney; under license from Disney, Sesame Workshop continues to use the term for their characters, as well as archival footage of Kermit the Frog.

Henson retained the rights to several productions featuring the Disney-owned Muppet characters, including Emmet Otter's Jug-Band Christmas; The Christmas Toy; Sesame Street: 20 and Still Counting; Henson's Place; Billy Bunny's Animal Songs; the original Dog City special; and Donna's Day. While some of these have since been released uncut, most current releases of Emmet Otter's Jug-Band Christmas and The Christmas Toy omit the appearances by Kermit the Frog. The 2015 ABC Family airing, the 2017 DVD and the 2018 Blu-ray releases of Emmet Otter's Jugband Christmas and the Amazon Prime Video release of The Christmas Toy reinstate Kermit's scenes.

After the acquisition was complete, Disney gradually began reintroducing the franchise to the mainstream, promoting the Muppets across different parts of the company. The Muppets made appearances on Disney Channel and starred in the ABC television film, The Muppets' Wizard of Oz (2005). A television special, A Muppets Christmas: Letters to Santa, premiered on NBC on December 17, 2008. As a method of regaining a wider audience, Disney produced a series of vignettes for YouTube and Disney.com. A "Bohemian Rhapsody" cover version was among these projects and immediately went viral, ultimately amassing 90 million views and winning two Webby Awards. In 2010, the Muppets starred in The Muppets Kitchen with Cat Cora, which co-starred Cat Cora and showcased cooking demonstrations. That same year, Disney used the Muppets to promote their volunteerism program at the company's theme parks. A Halloween special featuring the Muppets was developed during that time and expected to air on ABC that October, but was canceled.

2010s–present: Renewed success; current projects 
In 2011, the Muppets were featured in an eponymous seventh film, intended to serve as a "creative reboot" for the characters. Walt Disney Pictures had been furthering development on a Muppets film since 2008, when it considered adapting an unused screenplay by Jerry Juhl. Directed by James Bobin, written by Jason Segel and Nicholas Stoller, and starring Segel, Amy Adams, Chris Cooper, and Rashida Jones, The Muppets was a critical and commercial success, becoming the highest-grossing puppet film of all time and winning an Academy Award for Best Original Song. During the film's publicity campaign, the Muppets appeared in promotional advertisements and effusive marketing efforts by Disney and were also featured in a promotional video for Google+. In March 2012, the Muppets received a collective star on the Hollywood Walk of Fame. That year, the Muppets hosted a Just for Laughs comedy gala in Montreal.

Following the release of The Muppets, Disney announced an eighth film in 2012, with Bobin and Stoller returning to direct and write, respectively. Muppets Most Wanted was released in 2014 and starred Ricky Gervais, Tina Fey, and Ty Burrell. The film received positive reviews but was a commercial disappointment at the box office.

Disney Theatrical Productions announced in 2013 that a live show based on the Muppets was in active development and that a 15-minute show had been conducted by Thomas Schumacher to see how the technical components would work. Muppet Moments, an interstitial television series, premiered on Disney Junior in April 2015. The short-form series features conversations between the Muppets and young children.

After the release of Muppets Most Wanted, Disney was interested in expanding the Muppets' presence across other media platforms, particularly in television. Discussions for a new primetime series began internally within The Muppets Studio. By April 2015, Bill Prady was commissioned to write a script for a pilot with the working title Muppets 2015. In May 2015, ABC commissioned an eponymous series, co-developed by Prady and Bob Kushell and directed by Randall Einhorn. Developed as a parody of other mockumentary-style series such as The Office, Modern Family, and Parks and Recreation, The Muppets portrayed the everyday personal and professional lives of the Muppets in Los Angeles as they produced a late-night talk show hosted by Miss Piggy. The series premiered on September 22, 2015, in the United States, and received mixed reviews, with critics praising the show's adult humor but criticizing the writing and characterization. The Muppets was canceled after one season, which concluded on March 1, 2016.

In September 2017, the Muppets performed a live concert series at the Hollywood Bowl, hosted by Bobby Moynihan. This performance was followed by a second event in July 2018 at London's O2 Arena, their first outside of the United States.

In February 2018, Disney announced that a streaming television reboot series was in development for Disney+. The project, known as Muppets Live Another Day, was intended as a limited-run series set in the 1980s after the events of The Muppets Take Manhattan and depicted Kermit recruiting the Muppets to locate Rowlf the Dog after his disappearance. The series was intended to be directed by Jason Moore; written by Josh Gad, Adam Horowitz and Eddy Kitsis; produced by ABC Signature Studios and The Muppets Studio, and feature original music by Robert Lopez and Kristen Anderson-Lopez. After an executive change at The Muppets Studio that prompted a different creative direction for the Muppets, Disney canceled development on the project in September 2019. A second Disney+ series, Muppets Now, a short-form improvisational comedy series, was announced in August 2019 and was released on July 31, 2020. Muppets Haunted Mansion, a Halloween special based on the attraction of the same name, was released on October 8, 2021.
 
A third Disney+ series The Muppets Mayhem, was ordered in March 2022. The series will be developed and written by Adam F. Goldberg, Bill Barretta and Jeff Yorkes and starring the Dr. Teeth and the Electric Mayhem, Lilly Singh and Tahj Mowry.

Characters

The principal characters of The Muppet Show and subsequent media include Kermit the Frog, Miss Piggy, Fozzie Bear, Gonzo, Rowlf the Dog, Scooter, Rizzo the Rat, Pepe the King Prawn, Dr. Bunsen Honeydew, Beaker, Statler and Waldorf, the Swedish Chef, Sam Eagle, Camilla the Chicken, Walter, and the Electric Mayhem, fronted by Dr. Teeth (lead vocals, keyboards) and consisting of Animal (drums), Floyd Pepper (bass, background vocals), Janice (guitar, background vocals), Zoot (saxophone), and occasionally Lips (trumpet).

As well as The Muppet Show, the characters are popular for their appearances on Sesame Street and Fraggle Rock; and also feature in The Jimmy Dean Show, The Jim Henson Hour, Muppets Tonight, Bear in the Big Blue House, Statler and Waldorf: From the Balcony, and The Muppets. An adult-oriented segment, The Land of Gorch, was a regular feature in the first season of Saturday Night Live. Guest stars on Saturday Night Live occasionally include both the Muppets and Sesame Street characters, as well as Muppet likenesses of real people; these likenesses appear recurrently in early episodes of The Muppet Show and on Sesame Street, and appear occasionally on other series such as 30 Rock.

Following Disney's acquisition of the Muppets, puppets created by The Jim Henson Company are no longer referred to as Muppets. Puppets created by Jim Henson's Creature Shop, including those in Labyrinth and The Dark Crystal, have never been considered Muppets, as they are generally more complex in design and performance than regular Muppets. At Henson's suggestion, the Star Wars character Yoda was originally performed by Frank Oz, and has been loosely described as a Muppet in media and reference works; he is not, however, and Henson otherwise had no involvement in the character's conception.

Performers 

At the start of the Muppets' formation, Jim and Jane Henson were the group's only performers. In 1961, Jane retired to focus on raising their children. Seeking additional performers, Jim came into contact with Frank Oz that year. Although interested, Oz initially declined due to his youth and commitment to high school, and instead suggested Jerry Juhl, who worked with Oz at the Vagabond Puppet Theater in Oakland, California. Upon graduating, Oz subsequently joined in August 1963. By the time The Muppet Show began, the primary cast of performers grew to consist of Henson; Oz; Dave Goelz; Jerry Nelson; Richard Hunt; and later, Steve Whitmire, while Juhl became head writer for the series. From The Muppet Show onward, Kevin Clash; Kathryn Mullen; Louise Gold; Karen Prell; Fran Brill, Caroll Spinney; and Brian Henson performed several minor characters and assisted the main performers with puppeteering. Many of these puppeteers performed characters across The Muppet Show, Sesame Street, Fraggle Rock, and other Henson-related projects.

Henson, Hunt, and Nelson continued performing until their deaths in 1990, 1992, and 2012, respectively. Goelz, Whitmire, and Bill Barretta, who joined the main cast of performers in the mid-1990s, assumed Henson's characters, with Whitmire cast in the role of Beaker and Nelson cast in the role of Statler, both previously performed by Hunt. The remainder of Hunt's characters were left without a stable performer until David Rudman was cast in those roles in the late 2000s. Oz continued performing until his retirement from puppeteering in 2000; Eric Jacobson was cast as his characters beginning in 2002. At Nelson's behest, Matt Vogel gradually began performing his characters in 2008. Peter Linz joined the main cast in 2011, debuting the role of Walter in The Muppets, before inheriting four characters then-currently performed by Whitmire (Statler, Link Hogthrob, Lips, Foo-Foo), and Robin the Frog from Vogel, in 2017.

Whitmire was dismissed from the cast in 2016, with Vogel cast as Kermit the Frog in 2017, and most of Whitmire's other characters were assumed by the remainder of the cast. The Muppets are currently performed by a core cast of six principal puppeteers: Vogel, Jacobson, Goelz, Barretta, Rudman, and Linz, with the occasional ensemble of "additional" Muppet performers that includes Julianne Buescher, Tyler Bunch, Alice Dinnean, Bruce Lanoil, Mike Quinn and others.

Design and performance

The majority of the Muppets are designed as hand puppets, with several characters utilizing rods. Common design elements of the Muppets include wide mouths and large protruding eyes. Most of the Muppets are molded or carved out of various types of foam and covered with any felt-like material. The characters may represent humans; anthropomorphic characters; realistic animals; robots; extraterrestrial or mythical creatures; or other forms of abstract characters.

The Muppets are distinguished from ventriloquist dummies, which are usually animated only in the head and face, in that their arms or other features are also animated. They are also generally made of softer material. They are presented as being independent of the puppeteer, officially known as a "Muppet performer", who is usually hidden behind a set or outside of the camera frame. Using the camera frame to this advantage was an innovation of the Muppets. Prior to this, a stage was used to mask the performers, as would be the case in a live performance. Sometimes, they are seen full-bodied; in most cases, invisible strings are used to manipulate these puppets, with vocals added at a later point. Performers often use dollies to mimic walking.

Since 2006, Disney has contracted Puppet Heap to produce and maintain newer models of the Muppets. During most performances, the performer holds the character above their head or in front of their body, with one hand operating the head and mouth and the other manipulating the hands and arms, either with two separate control rods or – in the case of "live-hand" Muppets – wearing the hands similarly to gloves. One consequence of this design is that most of the Muppets are left-handed, with the performer using their right hand to operate the head while operating the arm with their left hand.

For more complex Muppets, several performers may operate a single character, with the performer controlling the mouth usually voicing the character. As technology has advanced, the Jim Henson team and other performers have developed several means to operate the Muppets for film and television; these include the use of suspended rigs, internal motors, remote manipulators, and computer enhanced and superimposed images. Creative use of different technologies has allowed for scenes in which the Muppets appear to exhibit complex movements wholly independently of the performer.

In his book, Street Gang, author Michael Davis wrote that the characters tend to develop "organically", alluding to the performers taking up to a year to develop their characters and voices. They are also "test-driven, passed around from one Henson troupe member to another in the hope of finding the perfect human-Muppet match". When interacting with them, children believed that Muppets were living beings, even when the performers were present.

Media

Filmography and television

Discography

On September 17, 2002, Rhino Records released The Muppet Show: Music, Mayhem, and More, a compilation album of music from The Muppet Show and subsequent film releases. With John Denver, John Denver and the Muppets: A Christmas Together was produced and released in 1979.

Under Disney ownership, The Muppets album releases have been issued by Walt Disney Records; as well as new album releases, some albums have been re-released, including The Muppet Christmas Carol in 2005 and The Muppet Movie in 2013. Legal music publishing rights to The Muppets songs are controlled by Fuzzy Muppet Songs and Mad Muppet Melodies, imprints of Disney Music Publishing.

Theme parks

Similar to other Disney characters, the Muppets appear at the Walt Disney Parks and Resorts, having first appeared at Walt Disney World in 1990. Their first featured attraction, Here Come the Muppets, was a live stage show that opened shortly after Jim Henson's death and ran at Disney's Hollywood Studios (known at that time as Disney-MGM Studios) for a year. Muppet*Vision 3D, a 4D film attraction that also uses audio-animatronic characters, opened at Disney's Hollywood Studios on May 16, 1991, exactly one year after Henson's death. It is notable as Henson's final directorial effort. Muppet*Vision 3D subsequently opened at Disney California Adventure, on February 8, 2001; this version closed in 2014.

The Muppets also were featured in The Muppets Present...Great Moments in American History at the Magic Kingdom from 2016 to 2020; and the Muppet Mobile Lab at Epcot since 2007. The latter attraction is a free-roving vehicle with audio-animatronics of Bunsen Honeydew and Beaker. As part of Disney's Living Character Initiative, it premiered at Epcot and was later previewed at Disney California Adventure and Hong Kong Disneyland.

In 2010, the Muppets were the face of the "Give a Day, Get a Disney Day" charity campaign. Kermit, Miss Piggy, and Sweetums appeared in daily parades at Disneyland and Magic Kingdom. The Muppets appeared in television and print ads for the campaign and were featured prominently on the campaign's Web site.

Disney has released numerous collector pins featuring the Muppets since 2004. These include Limited Edition pins, Hidden Mickey pin collections, mystery pin sets, 2008 pin sets promoting The Muppets, cast lanyard pins, and assorted individual rack pins. Over 100 pins displaying the characters have been released overall.

Publishing
Among other print media, the Muppets have featured in comics since the 1970s. An eponymous comic strip by Guy and Brad Gilchrist first ran on September 21, 1981, in over 500 daily newspapers, six months after The Muppet Show ended its five-year run. By the end of its run in 1986, the comic strip was seen in over 660 newspapers worldwide. Many of the strips were compiled in various book collections. Special strips were also created in color, exclusively for issues of Muppet Magazine.

Muppet Magazine was published from 1983 to 1989. The magazine was presented as being run by the Muppets themselves and included such features as celebrity interviews and comic stories.

The only Muppets film adapted as a comic book was The Muppets Take Manhattan. The comic book series was adapted by Marvel Comics in 1984, as the 68-page story in Marvel Super Special issue #32. The adaptation was later re-printed into three limited series issues, released under Marvel's Star Comics imprint (November 1984 – January 1985).

In the wake of Muppet Babies''' success, Star Comics adapted the series into a bi-monthly title, of which 26 issues were produced.

The final issue of Disney Adventures, released in 2007, included a one-page strip by Roger Langridge. In 2009, Boom! Studios began publishing a series of comic books based on The Muppet Show, written and illustrated by Langridge. Following two mini-series, an ongoing series, The Muppet Show Comic Book, was published for eleven issues. Additionally, Boom! Studios published fairy tale adaptations centered on the Muppets. In 2012, the Langridge series was transferred to Marvel Comics, which released an omnibus edition in 2013.

In popular culture

The Muppets' prevalence in popular culture is such that the characters have become regarded as celebrities in their own right. The Muppets have a collective star on the Hollywood Walk of Fame, with Kermit having been previously individually inducted in 2002. The characters have appeared at the Academy Awards and Emmy Awards; made cameo appearances in films including Rocky III, An American Werewolf in London, and Mr. Magorium's Wonder Emporium; and have been interviewed on the news magazine 60 Minutes.

Kermit was interviewed by Jon Stewart on The Daily Show; guest hosted The Tonight Show, Jimmy Kimmel Live!, Extreme Makeover: Home Edition, America's Funniest Home Videos, and an April Fools' Day edition of Larry King Live; and has served as Grand Marshal of the Tournament of Roses Parade. The characters also appeared on The Cosby Show and The Torkelsons, among other sitcoms. The music video for Weezer's "Keep Fishin'" is aesthetically based on The Muppet Show and consists of the band interacting with the characters.

On September 28, 2005, the United States Postal Service released a Jim Henson and the Muppets postage stamp series. The Muppets also appeared on Dick Clark's New Year's Rockin' Eve on December 31, 2007, in which Kermit and other characters presented segments following advertising breaks. After one such segment, with Kermit in Times Square, co-host Ryan Seacrest thanked "Kerms" for his assistance. Miss Piggy has appeared as a guest on The Late Late Show with Craig Ferguson, and Kermit appeared on Hollywood Squares and as one of the celebrity commentators on VH1's I Love documentary series. The Muppets, as well as the title character of Bear in the Big Blue House, have made frequent appearances on The Jerry Lewis MDA Labor Day Telethon.

On July 25, 2007, the Center for Puppetry Arts in Atlanta announced the opening of the Jim Henson Wing, which would house up to 700 retired Muppet characters. The wing, first set to open in 2012 with films, sketches, and other materials from the Jim Henson Company archives, eventually opened as a gallery within the Worlds of Puppetry exhibition at the Center in November 2015.

Muppet-like characters star in the Broadway musical Avenue Q, the concept of which is a parody of Sesame Street. The Peter Jackson film Meet the Feebles, a satire on the television industry, is largely reminiscent of The Muppet Show. A Kermit the Frog stuffed toy rigged to spray fake vomit recurred on Late Night with Conan O'Brien, and the Muppets were frequently preempted at the beginning of episodes of You Can't Do That on Television. The sitcom series Greg the Bunny centered on sentient hand puppets working on a Muppet-like children's show. Among other examples, series such as The Simpsons, Family Guy, The West Wing, and Robot Chicken have referenced the Muppets.

The term "muppet" is commonly used in the British Isles and Australasia to refer to a stupid or ineffectual person.

References

Works cited
 Davis, Michael (2008). Street Gang: The Complete History of Sesame Street. New York: Viking Penguin. 
 Finch, Christopher (1981). Of Muppets and Men. New York: Alfred A. Knopf, Inc. 
Jones, Brian J. (2013). Jim Henson: The Biography. New York: Ballantine Books. 
 Morrow, Robert W. (2006). Sesame Street and the Reform of Children's Television''. Baltimore, Maryland: Johns Hopkins University Press.

External links

 

The Muppets
American comedy troupes
Mass media franchises introduced in 1955
Television characters introduced in 1955
Disney Consumer Products franchises
Puppet troupes
Sketch comedy troupes
Television shows adapted into films
Television shows adapted into comics
Television shows adapted into video games
Walt Disney Records artists
Fictional musical groups
Disney acquisitions
Comedy franchises
Grammy Award winners
Puppetry in the United States